Ahwahnee Heritage Days is a festival held in Yosemite Valley, in Yosemite National Park, every February or March annually. The Ahwahnee Hotel celebrates the Roaring Twenties, and the 1930s and 1940s - with music performances, as well as cultural and history events.

Ahwahnee Heritage Days was originally held to celebrate the 75th anniversary of the Ahwahnee Hotel in 2002, and is brought back every year under various names.

See also
Ahwahnechee people
History of the Yosemite area

References

Yosemite National Park
Festivals in California
History of the Sierra Nevada (United States)
Tourist attractions in Mariposa County, California
Cultural festivals in the United States